Joal-Fadiouth is a town and commune in the Thiès Region at the end of the Petite Côte of Senegal, south-east of Dakar.

Joal lies on the mainland, while Fadiouth, linked by a bridge, lies on an island of clam shells, which are also used in local architecture and crafts.  The village has no motorised transport evidenced by the sign on entering.  It has large Christian and Muslim populations with cemeteries on another shell island.  Another attraction is granaries on stilts in the water. The population of the commune in 2013 was some 46,000.

History
While the origin of the village remains disputed, the establishment of the Serer in the area is assumed to have begun when the advance of the Almoravids in the 11th century forced them to leave the Sénégal River valley, occupying the Petite Côte and the region of the Sine River. Another theory claims that Joal and Fadiouth have been founded by the Guelowar when they were expelled from the kingdom of Kaabu. Both of these theories find their validation by observing the frequency of certain surnames, indicating ethnic group in the region.

In the early 17th century, until around 1635, a community of Portuguese Jewish traders lived in the village, trading with West Africa, Portugal and the Netherlands. Protected by the local chief, they were allowed to openly profess their religion, to the annoyance of the Portuguese (Catholic) government.

During the colonial period, Joal became one of the largest trading posts in Western Senegal. The setting up of European posts during the triangular trade made the village one of the regions that was penetrated by missionaries as early as the 17th-century. The proselytisation however was met by strong resistance by the local population, delaying large-scale evangelising by the Europeans to the 19th-century when Senegal became a French colony. In 1850, a mission was finally established in the village, the first priest was ordained there in 1885.

It was during that time that the passage of El Hadj Umar Tall was commemorated by building a mosque for his appraisal. The important architectural legacy recalling this memorable passing is in danger of deterioration.

Administration

Joal-Fadiouth was initially a canton, later on a county seat. It was elevated to a commune on 1 February 1966, with the process being completed by decree n° 72-82 on 3 February 1972 defining the borders of the commune.

Today, Joal-Fadiouth is a part of the M'bour Department, occupying the southernmost point of the Thiès Region.

Bordering the Atlantic Ocean in the west, the commune incorporates the rural community of Nguéniène in the north and the rural community of Palmarin in the south.

Its mayors have been Jean Collin, Emmanuel Sobel Diouf, Paul Ndong and presently Boucar Diouf

Geology
Joal-Fadiouth occupies an intermediate point between the Sahel Belt and the humid Casamance region.

Due to its position in an estuary, the greater part of the commune (3,021 hectares) is seasonally flooded.

The climate is typical of the Sahel with 3 to 4 months of winter from July to October and mild temperatures from November to April. The annual average temperature is 29 °C.

The mangrove woods are populated by sea birds (sea gulls, woodcocks, pelicans, flamingos). Monkeys, ciconias and hyenas are also to be found there. 
This island has millions of sea shells, the local people use the shells to decorate their graves.

Population

The most recent census of 2013 put the population at 45,903 people. The population is predominantly  of Serer origin. In a country with an overwhelming majority of Muslims, the inhabitants of the isle of Fadiouth are 90% Christian.

Economy

The main income of Joal is fishing (it is the largest fishing harbour of Senegal), agriculture and tourism.

Famous personalities
The first president of Senegal, Léopold Sédar Senghor, was born at Joal. It is possible to visit his birthplace which carries the name Mbind Diogoye ("lion's mansion" in Serer)
Yékini, the champion of Senegalese wrestling was born in Joal.
The first missionary who died in Senegal is buried in the cemetery of Fadiouth with a white cross marking his grave.
In 2000, the writer Kama Sywor Kamanda was made an honorary citizen of Joal-Fadiouth.

Climate
Fadiouth has a hot semi-arid climate (BSh) with no rainfall from November to May and moderate to heavy rainfall from June to October.

References

External links

Atlantic islands of Senegal
Communes of Senegal
Historic Jewish communities in West Africa
Jews and Judaism in Senegal
Populated places in Thiès Region
Sephardi Jewish culture in Africa
Portuguese-Jewish diaspora in Africa
Petite Côte